Bannercatch is a video game version of Capture the flag published by Scholastic in 1984 for the Apple II and Commodore 64. An edutainment game, Bannercatch allows up to two humans (each alternating between two characters in the game world) to play against an increasingly difficult team of four AI bots.

Gameplay

Bannercatchs game world is divided into quadrants: home, enemy, and two "no-mans land" areas which hold the jails. A successful capture requires bringing the enemy flag into one team's "home" quadrant. Players can be captured when in an enemy territory, or in "no-mans land" while holding a flag. Captured players must be "rescued" from their designated jail by one of the other members of the team. Fallen flags remain where they dropped until a time-out period elapses, after which the flag returns to one of several starting locations in home territory. The 2D map also has walls, trees and a moving river, enabling a wide variety of strategies. Special locations in the play area allow humans to query the game state (such as flag status) using binary messages.

Reception
Phil Seyer for Antic said "The action can be quite exciting as you try to elude Max's robots or chase them when they steal your flag."

Tan A. Summers for Family Computing said "Bannercatch'''s best lesson may be the wonderful "Aha!" feeling that's a part of the discovery that occurs as you play it."InfoWorld'''s Essential Guide to Atari said "Earning points for tagging, capturing and winning are a lot of fun, but learning the skills involved in cooperation and teamwork are applicable skills in every facet of life."

References

1984 video games
Action video games
Apple II games
Atari 8-bit family games
Children's educational video games
Commodore 64 games
Video games developed in the United States